The Yangon Urban Mass Rapid Transit (YUMRT) is a proposed rapid transit system for Myanmar's largest city Yangon. The initial line is due for completion in 2027, becoming Myanmar's first rapid transit system.

Background
An initial proposal in 2015 from the Japan International Cooperation Agency (JICA) envisioned two underground rail lines in Yangon along with a light rapid transit network. In April 2019, JICA was announced to be providing assistance to the Burmese Ministry of Transport regarding the project, which was then confirmed to consist of elevated lines.

Network
The first line will consist of an  elevated line from Hlaingthaya Township to Parami railway station. The proposed line will begin at Hlaingthaya station, cross the Hlaing River south of Bayinnaung Bridge, before reaching Okkyin railway station along Parami Road. Eventually the line will reach Togyaunggalay railway station.

See also
 Rail transport in Myanmar
 Yangon Circular Railway
 Yangon Tram
 Yangon BRT

References

Rail transport in Myanmar
2027 in rail transport